The Kimball mining disaster happened on July 18, 1919, at the Carswell coal mine in Kimball, West Virginia, killing six miners.   Initial reports said that 221 men had been killed but they were trapped by the explosion. A rescue party was able to dig through the wreckage, allowing 215 to return alive to the surface.

Bibliography 
Notes

References 
 - Total pages: 295 
 

Coal mining disasters in West Virginia
1919 disasters in the United States
1919 mining disasters
1919 in West Virginia 
July 1919 events